MDMB-4en-PINACA (also incorrectly known as 5-CL-ADB-A) is an indazole-based synthetic cannabinoid that has been sold online as a designer drug. In 2021, MDMB-4en-PINACA was the most common synthetic cannabinoid identified by the Drug Enforcement Administration in the United States.  MDMB-4en-PINACA differs from 5F-MDMB-PINACA due to replacement of 5-fluoropentyl with a pent-4-ene moiety (4-en).

It acts as a potent agonist of the CB1 receptor with an EC50 value of 2.47 nM.

Legal status

Sweden's public health agency suggested classifying MDMB-4en-PINACA as a hazardous substance, on December 18, 2019.

See also 

 ADB-PINACA
 ADB-4en-PINACA
 MDMB-CHMICA
 MDMB-CHMINACA
 MDMB-FUBINACA
 MMB-4en-PICA

References 

Cannabinoids
Designer drugs
Indazolecarboxamides